The Mountainaire Hotel Historic District encompasses a pair of former hotel buildings at 1100 Park Avenue in Hot Springs, Arkansas.  They are virtually identical four story masonry structures, clad in a buff brick veneer, with stepped facades in an Art Moderne style.  They were built about 1947, as part of a planned five-building complex, and are one a small number of Art Moderne buildings in the city.  They were built by A.I. Albinson, originally from Minnesota, and operated as a hotel for about twenty years.  They were thereafter converted to an elderly care facility.  At the time they were listed on the National Register of Historic Places in 2004, the buildings stood vacant.

See also
National Register of Historic Places listings in Garland County, Arkansas

References

Buildings and structures completed in 1947
Buildings and structures in Hot Springs, Arkansas
Hotel buildings on the National Register of Historic Places in Arkansas
Historic districts on the National Register of Historic Places in Arkansas
Streamline Moderne architecture in the United States
National Register of Historic Places in Hot Springs, Arkansas
Hotels in Arkansas